Dritan Resuli (born 25 April 1976) is an Albanian football manager and former player.

References

1976 births
Living people
Albanian footballers
Association football defenders
Kategoria Superiore players
KF Flamurtari players
KS Egnatia Rrogozhinë players
KF Flamurtari managers
Kategoria Superiore managers
Albanian football managers